Monte Freidour is a mountain in the Cottian Alps, Metropolitan City of Turin in Piedmont, north-western Italy.

History 

At the top of the mountain is a monument celebrating the 8 members of the crew (F/Sgt. C.W. Lawton (Australian), Sgt.s T.D. Fotheringham, E.H.A. Clift, G. Tennison, D.W. Bishop, D.R. Wellon, S.E. Lockton and J. Bucks) of a British Liberator bomber that crashed there on 14 October 1944, during a mission in support of Italian partisans.

Access to the summit 
The peak can also be reached from Talucco, a frazione of Pinerolo, and from Cantalupa or Giaveno. The Monte Tre Denti is located nearby. The summit can also be reache bu mountain bike.

References

Freidour